Denu is a small town which is the capital of Ketu South Municipal, a district on the south-eastern corner of the Volta Region of Ghana, next to Aflao the border town with Togo. The name Denu literally means by the boundary. The town is sandwiched between the sea and lagoon on its south and north respectively.

See also
Ketu South (Ghana parliament constituency)

References

External links
Ketu South District on GhanaDistricts.com

Populated places in the Volta Region